Pleistodontes achorus is a species of fig wasp which is native to Australia.  The host fig is unknown, but based on the size of the wasp and the site where it was collected, Carlos Lopez-Vaamonde and coauthors suggested that the host is likely to be Ficus crassipes, F. watkinsiana, F. triradiata or F. pleurocarpa.

References 

Agaonidae
Hymenoptera of Australia
Insects described in 2002